Francisco Éverton de Almeida Andrade (born 8 August 1984 in Maranguape), better known as Everton, is a Brazilian footballer who acts as a steering centre midfielder and left wingback. He currently plays for Fortaleza.

Career statistics
(Correct )

Honours
Cruzeiro
Campeonato Mineiro: 2011
Campeonato Brasileiro Série A: 2013

Joinville
Campeonato Brasileiro Série B: 2014

 Fortaleza
 Campeonato Cearense: 2015, 2016

External links

1984 births
Living people
Sportspeople from Ceará
Brazilian footballers
Campeonato Brasileiro Série A players
Campeonato Brasileiro Série B players
Campeonato Brasileiro Série C players
Ferroviário Atlético Clube (CE) players
Grêmio Barueri Futebol players
Fluminense FC players
Cruzeiro Esporte Clube players
Criciúma Esporte Clube players
Joinville Esporte Clube players
Fortaleza Esporte Clube players
Figueirense FC players
Association football defenders
Association football midfielders